Mamadou A. Soumaré (born 17 February 2001) is a swimmer who competed for Mali at the 2012 Summer Olympics in the Men's 100m freestyle event. He finished first in Heat 1 against swimmers from the Maldives, Tanzania, and Burundi; and placed, overall, 52nd with his time of 57.32 seconds. However, he did not advance to the next round.

References 

1992 births
Malian male freestyle swimmers
Olympic swimmers of Mali
Swimmers at the 2012 Summer Olympics
Living people
Swimmers at the 2015 African Games
African Games competitors for Mali
21st-century Malian people